Kanata is an indigenous Canadian word in the Iroquoian language meaning "village" or "settlement". It is the origin of the name of Canada.

Kanata may also refer to:

 Kanata, Ontario, a suburban district of Ottawa, Canada
 Kanata Aikawa (born 2004), Japanese voice actress
 Kanata Hongō (born 1990), Japanese actor
 Kanata Irei (born 1982), a Japanese actor
 Kanata Okajima (born 1984), Japanese songwriter
 Kanata Izumi, a character from the anime/manga series Lucky Star
 Kanata Konoe, a character from the media project Nijigasaki High School Idol Club
 52500 Kanata, an asteroid
 Maz Kanata, a former space pirate in the sequel era of the Star Wars universe

See also
 Canada (disambiguation)

Japanese unisex given names